Assassin's Creed: Bloodlines is a 2009 action-adventure video game developed by Griptonite Games and published by Ubisoft. It is the second spin-off installment in the Assassin's Creed franchise, and acts as a direct sequel to Assassin's Creed (2007). Beginning shortly after that game's events, Bloodlines follows Altaïr Ibn-LaʼAhad as he travels to Cyprus to eliminate the last remnants of the Templar Order and learn more about their plans. The game also explores Altaïr's relationship with Maria Thorpe, a Templar agent whose life he spared in the first game and who would eventually become his wife.

The game was announced by Sony at the E3 Conference in June 2009 as a new title for their PlayStation Portable console. Bloodlines was released in November 2009, concurrently with Assassin's Creed II and Assassin's Creed II: Discovery, and received mixed reviews from critics. The next spin-off in the series, Assassin's Creed III: Liberation, was released in October 2012.

Gameplay 
Assassin's Creed: Bloodlines is an action-adventure, stealth game set in an open world environment. The gameplay is nearly identical to that of Assassin's Creed in terms of control style, although there were minor modifications to the control scheme, due to the lack of specific keys and buttons on the PlayStation Portable. Some features from the previous game, such as Eagle Vision, were removed.
 
One difference between the two games is the number of civilians present on the street. While the first game was filled with random civilians, Bloodlines has little to no civilians, explained in-game that the people were in a constant state of insecurity due to the new system of governance. Still, civilians will react to Altaïr's improper behavior, such as scaling buildings, and running around the streets.

Stealth in Bloodlines was downgraded due to the control scheme. Blending was also downgraded, due to the system platform. Although scholars are still present in-game, Altaïr can no longer use them as a way to hide. Although Altaïr can still blend, it only acts as a way to safely bypass guards without raising suspicion. Scaling the side of buildings was made easier and faster, resulting in simpler animations, again, due to the system's inferiority. High and Low profile movements are still present in-game, though they have been downgraded as well.

Taking the place of flags, a new collectible featured in the game are Templar Coins that can be used to upgrade the player's health bar, and the amount of damage a weapon can inflict. Three types of coins are present in game: Bronze, Silver and Gold, with Gold holding the highest value. Similar to the previous game, side-missions are available to players, such as saving civilians from Templar soldiers and performing specific tasks for allies of the resistance. The variety of tasks has been expanded, such as delivering letters, and intercepting couriers. In return, Altaïr will receive coins as a reward, instead of assistance from previous groups, such as scholars and vigilantes.

The game is primarily set on the island of Cyprus, where players can freely explore the cities of Limassol and Kyrenia. Due to the smaller size of the map, horseback riding was removed in Bloodlines. Like in the previous game, Altaïr can synchronize from high vantage points around the city in order to map out the city. Although the map itself is already drawn out, synchronizing will provide the locations of various side-missions.

Bloodlines features a few new assassination techniques and weapons. Weapons from the previous game are also present, such as Altaïr's sword, his hidden blade, throwing knives, and his fists. Assassinations are also similar to the first game, although the animation has been toned down to better fit the system. A new, yet very minor assassination technique has been added to the game, allowing Altaïr to pull opponents off of ledges, similar to Assassin's Creed II.

In Bloodlines, cut-scenes are played through preset dialogue, with the character models acting in preset motions and gestures. Unique gestures were only present in confrontations between boss characters, such as Moloch and the Dark Oracle. Subtitles were also added to the game. This enabled easier understanding of the game plot

Story missions and assassinations were simplified and straightforward. As a replacement for eaves-dropping and pick-pocketing, missions are structured similarly to Assassin's Creed II, with Altaïr handling one task after another and slowly gathering vital information from both his allies and enemies as each mission is completed.

Bloodlines features in-game achievements, which reward players with Templar coins. Achievements can be earned after performing specific tasks, such as killing a set number of soldiers in a specified order, and also collecting all of the Templar coins located throughout the game world. 

Despite all the downgrades, the game has a unique new feature, not present in any other Assassin's Creed title. Altaïr can now regain throwing knives by walking over his used ones. Since pick-pocketing was removed and was the only way to regain throwing knives in the first game, Altaïr can now re-use his throwing knives provided that: the knife he threw landed on the ground or an enemy; if the knife lands on water, Altaïr cannot retrieve them. Throwing knives may also be regained by interacting with the newly added knife box in the safehouses.

Plot
A few months after the events of Assassin's Creed, Altaïr Ibn-La'Ahad, now the Mentor of the Assassin Brotherhood, learns of a plan of the remaining Templars to escape to Cyprus, and so infiltrates one of their strongholds in Acre to stop them. Although he fails to prevent the Templars' escape, he does defeat and capture Maria Thorpe, who attempted to avenge her former master, Robert de Sablé, who died at Altaïr's hands. Managing to charter a ship, Altaïr also heads to Cyprus in pursuit of the Templars, with Maria in tow.

Once there, he learns of the presence of Armand Bouchart, who has succeeded Robert de Sablé as Grand Master of the Templar Order. Altaïr gains the assistance of a resistance movement on Cyprus opposed to the presence of the Templars, who, after purchasing the island from King Richard, have formed a repressive government to control the land and its people. He also learns of a Templar "archive", a trove of Templar knowledge and artifacts, hidden somewhere on the island. True to the way of the Assassins, Altaïr manages to both locate the archive and free Cyprus from Bouchart's grip, after assassinating all of his underlings: Frederick "the Red"; Moloch "the Bull"; Shalim and Shahar "the Twins", and the Dark Oracle "the Witch". Eventually, Altaïr confronts Bouchart himself inside the archive, whose contents have been evacuated and relocated by the Templars, and kills him as the archive begins to collapse, although Altaïr manages to escape.

The game also details the relationship between Altaïr and Maria. At first, Maria is hostile and sarcastic towards Altaïr (in her own words, "the man who spared my neck but ruined my life"), but as the story develops, she gradually warms to the Assassin who, despite her repeated escape attempts, repeatedly rescues her from harm and does not punish her. Eventually, she decides to assist Altaïr by killing a Templar mole in the Cyproit resistance when he attempts to kill Altaïr, and helping him defeat Bouchart in the final battle, at this point having fallen in love with the Assassin. After escaping from the Templar archive, Maria tells Altaïr of her intentions to abandon the Templars and travel the world, with Altaïr agreeing to accompany her on her journey.

Connectivity
Assassin's Creed: Bloodlines features exclusive connectivity with the PlayStation 3's version of Assassin's Creed II. It was revealed at the E3 2009 that by connecting a PlayStation Portable to the PlayStation 3, six unique weapons can be unlocked in both games. A new weapon is unlocked for use in Assassin's Creed II each time a boss in Bloodlines is defeated. Furthermore, coins acquired in Bloodlines can be transferred over as Florins to Assassin's Creed II. Vice versa, in Bloodlines, extra health, the ability to block with the hidden blade, and the ability to shoot daggers can be unlocked from acquiring codex pages in Assassin's Creed II.

Reception

Assassin's Creed: Bloodlines has received mixed reviews from critics. It received a 5.5 from GameSpot which praised its sound-effects but heavily criticized the platforming, small areas and over-emphasis on combat neglecting other areas. However IGN gave it a 6.9 criticizing its repetitive sound effects as well as one dimensional combat but praising the game's visuals. GameSpy gave the game a 2.5 out of 5 praising its faithfulness to the series and its gameplay though heavily criticizing its environments, repetitive gameplay as well as poor script and voice-acting. GameZone Louis Bedigian gave the game a 5.3/10, saying the game is "Generic at best, Assassin's Creed: Bloodlines is a great example of what can be done on the PSP visually, but should in no way be considered an example of great gameplay."

References

External links

2009 video games
Action-adventure games
Bloodlines
Open-world video games
PlayStation Portable games
PlayStation Portable-only games
Single-player video games
Stealth video games
Ubisoft games
Video games developed in Canada
Video games developed in the United States
Video game sequels
Video games set in Acre, Israel
Video games set in Cyprus
Video games set in the 12th century
Video games set in the Middle Ages
Griptonite Games